Sarunyu Winaipanit (September 12, 1984, Chainat, Thailand), nicknamed Ice is a Thai singer and actor. His love for entertaining has brought him the nickname ‘The Prince of Smiles’.

Profile 
Sarunyu Winaipanit was born on September 12, 1984. His parents are Thai teachers. He graduated from Srinakharinwirot University, Faculty of fine arts with a Bachelor's in Acting and Directing.

In 2003, he won a competition at GMM's, the first stage project show and that is how he got into the music business. In 2006, Ice released his debut album, ICE Sarunyu along with the single "Kon Jai Ngai" under the label Thai GMM Grammy. He later released a Japanese version of the song entitled "Koi Nanja Nai". One year later, he released his second album, Party on Ice, followed by ICE Kool Hits in 2008, which is a compilation album of songs from his two previous albums and work he had done on other albums.

Winaipanit also worked alongside fellow Thai pop singers Palitchoke Ayanaputra (Peck) and Pongsak Rattanapong (Aof), under the name PECK AOF ICE, and released an album, entitled Together, along with singles "Kae Kon Toh Pid" and "Narak Na LOVE".

His album รักกันนะ (Rak Kan Na) was released in 2012. He has starred in some Thai lakorns.

Discography

Studio albums
 2006 – ICE Sarunyu
 2007 – Party on ICE
 2008 – ICE WITH U
 2010 – ICE Festa
 2012 – Rak Kan Na (รักกันนะ)

Awards
Partial listing of awards won
 2019 – Golden TV Awards for best TV soundtrack: Love Destiny
 2019 – 10th Nataraj Awards for best TV soundtrack: Love Destiny

References 

Saranyu Winaipanit
Saranyu Winaipanit
Living people
1984 births
Saranyu Winaipanit
Saranyu Winaipanit
Saranyu Winaipanit
Saranyu Winaipanit
Thai television personalities
Saranyu Winaipanit